Samyang can refer to:

 Samyang-dong, a neighborhood in Seoul
 Samyang Food, a food manufacturer
 Samyang Optics, a South Korean manufacturer of camera equipment and electronics
 Kumho Tires, a company previously named Samyang Tire